Hyder Creek is a river in Otsego County in the state of New York. It begins west of the Hamlet of Richfield and flows east, then southeast before flowing into Canadarago Lake south of the Village of Richfield Springs.

Fishing
Suckers can be speared and taken from the creek from January 1 to May 15, each year.

References 

Rivers of New York (state)
Rivers of Otsego County, New York